A pool party is a party in which guests swim in a swimming pool.

Pool Party may also refer to:

 "Pool Party" (Julia Jacklin song), 2016
 "Pool Party" (Lizzie McGuire), a 2001 episode of the American teen sitcom
 "Pool Party" (Modern Family), a 2019 episode of the American TV family sitcom 
 "Pool Party" (The Office), a 2012 episode of the American comedy TV series
 Pool Party (video game), a 2007 Wii game
 "Pool Party!", a 2000 song by The Aquabats

See also
 
Pool Parties, a series of free outdoor concerts in Brooklyn, U.S.
 2015 Texas pool party incident
 Jordan Poole, NBA Player called "Poole Party"